Seirae or Seirai, was a town in ancient Arcadia, located 30 stadia from Psophis, on the road from Cleitor, and on the boundary between the two.
 
Its site is unlocated.

References

Populated places in ancient Arcadia
Former populated places in Greece
Lost ancient cities and towns